Anastasia Dețiuc (born 14 December 1998) is a Czech–Moldovan tennis player.

She has a career-high WTA doubles ranking of 79 reached on 9 January 2023. 
On the junior tour, Dețiuc had a career-high combined ranking of 22, achieved January 2016.

Playing for Moldova Fed Cup team, Dețiuc has a win–loss record of 3–1 in Fed Cup competition.

In February 2018, she switched nationalities to represent the Czech Republic.

WTA career finals

Doubles: 1 (title)

ITF Circuit finals

Singles: 5 (3 titles, 2 runner–ups)

Doubles: 28 (16 titles, 12 runner–ups)

References

External links
 
 
 

1998 births
Living people
Moldovan female tennis players
Czech female tennis players
Place of birth missing (living people)
Moldovan people of Ukrainian descent
Moldovan people of Russian descent
Czech people of Ukrainian descent
Czech people of Russian descent
Moldovan emigrants to the Czech Republic